Sarah Y. Mason (March 31, 1896 – November 28, 1980) was an American screenwriter and script supervisor.

Biography
Mason was born Sarah Yeiser Mason in Pima, Arizona. She and her husband Victor Heerman won the Academy Award for best screenplay adaptation for their adaptation for the 1933 film Little Women, based on the novel by Louisa May Alcott.

After that success, she and Heerman were the first screenwriters involved in early, never-produced scripts commissioned for what would become MGM's Pride and Prejudice (1940 film). Mason's career is also notable as she was the very first script supervisor in Hollywood, having invented the craft of film continuity when the industry switched from silent film to talkies.

She and Heerman married in 1921. She died at age 84 in Los Angeles and was cremated. Victor and Sarah had two children, Catharine Anliss Heerman, an artist and teacher of art in Southern California who was previously married to record producer Lester Koenig; and Victor, Jr., a successful breeder of thoroughbred racehorses. The Academy Award for Little Women remains with the family.

Partial filmography
Arizona (1918) (continuity)
Bound in Morocco (1918) (continuity)
The Poor Simp (1920) (scenario)
Held In Trust (1920) (scenario)
The Chicken in the Case (1921)
 A Divorce of Convenience (1921)
 The Girl from Nowhere (1921)
 Modern Matrimony (1923)
 Backstage (1927)
Cradle Snatchers (1927) (scenario)
The Broadway Melody (1929) (continuity)
Alias Jimmy Valentine (1928) (continuity)
Little Women (1933) (screenplay)
The Age of Innocence (1934) (screenplay) 
Imitation of Life (1934) (uncredited) 
The Little Minister (1934) (screenplay) 
Break of Hearts (1935) (screen play) 
Magnificent Obsession (1935) (screenplay) 
Stella Dallas (1937) (screenplay) 
Golden Boy (1939) (screenplay) 
Pride and Prejudice (1940) (uncredited) 
Meet Me in St. Louis: 1944 (uncredited) 
Little Women (1949) (screenplay) 
A Girl, a Guy, and a Gob (1941) (uncredited) 
Magnificent Obsession (1954) (based upon the screenplay by)

References

External links

Sarah Y. Mason at the Women Film Pioneers Project

1896 births
1980 deaths
American script supervisors
Best Adapted Screenplay Academy Award winners
Women film pioneers
American women screenwriters
20th-century American women writers
20th-century American screenwriters